Women's beachwear fashion developed during the 19th and 20th centuries as rail travel became available in Europe and mass tourism became widespread. The beach in particular became a holiday destination where people could relax. The inhabitants of large industrial cities took to vacationing in locations that provided a contrast to their home areas. The practice spread worldwide and wealthy women desired new stylish outdoor garments to wear.

Seaside tourism
Seaside tourism began in the middle of the 18th century. Before then, the coastal landscape was synonymous with danger, a place where natural disasters occurred. The sea was thought of as a boundary separating people, and literature presented it as a place of unpredictable travel and shipwrecks. 
In the 16th and 17th, centuries there was a change in attitudes to the seaside. English doctors promoted visiting the seaside to the nobility as a therapy for melancholy and for sickness of the spleen. In the middle of the 19th century, Thomas Cook & Son began to organize escorted tours for the English nobility to the Mediterranean, particularly the French Riviera and Liguria. Between 1860 and 1914, Nice became one of the most popular places to stay. Subsequent developments in rail travel helped to make the seaside a place where city dwellers could readily escape from urban noise and pollution. Those taking vacations at the beach found their bodies becoming cultural symbols representing their identity and style.

History
The early 1800s was the beginning of a period of innovation in swimwear. Women who travelled to the beaches for seaside recreation typically wore knee-length, puffed-sleeved, wool dresses that were often black in color and featured a sailor collar. This outfit had the goal of covering all of the woman's skin to avoid a suntan, since tanned skin was a sign of belonging to the social class of common laborers.

At this time beachgoers often made use of bathing machines. These were wooden huts on wheels pulled by horses, and were usually located along recreational beaches where the water was shallow. People undressed inside the bathing machines, which were then drawn out into deeper water in order to let their occupants bathe unobserved.

By the end of the 19th century, there was a need to have swimsuits that were less burdensome. This allowed exposure of the sun and better comfort for the new popular seaside activities. However, at the time, the only game for women at the beach involved jumping through the waves while holding on a rope attached to a buoy.

The first attempt to a modernisation of the female swimsuit happened in early 20th century, by Anette Kellerman, an Australian swimmer, who designed a form-fitting and more convenient swimsuit for a competition.  

The bikini was introduced in 1946 by two French designers, Louis Réard and Jacob Heim, who redesigned the female swimsuit by dividing it into two pieces. At the beginning of its invention, it was given the name of ''.
Although the bottom of the stomach was still covered, as it is not always today, this was an important transformation because this new form of beachwear was quickly accepted and gave women more physical and metaphorical freedom.
In the 1950s, women's curves were emphasized together with vivid colors until the 1970s, when sexual revolution was in full force. The cultural parameters were increasingly influenced by the media and being inspired by multiple TV series, such as the famous "Baywatch" show in 1989, where the high-cut leg become popular, modeling a look of sports.
Nowadays, fashion continues on this track. The swimwear industry is driven by the influences of ever-changing fashion styles and the media, such as TV, advertising, and the web.

Business

Thanks to the birth of beachwear fashion, business developed in relation to swimwear.

Occasions of use and materials
The principal occasion of using beachwear was the maritime holiday, and the most common material used in the making of swimwear was Lycra, which had the ability to stretch up to 7 times its original size. In 1974, Lycra was introduced to the market of beachwear. This transformation allowed the replacement of swimwear from wet and misshapen clothes to lighter garments.
Another occasion refers to the use of beachwear in sport. In 2008, swimwear provided inserts of plastic material with the aim of reducing friction with the water and improving sport performance. Fashion shows are another occasion of use where many brands choose to show their swimwear lines. In this case, the beachwear is created to attract attention.

Industry innovations

Thanks to the development of science, society, and new technologies, there are innovations.
The first concerns the birth of burkinis, created for Muslim women. This is similar to a diving suit made more feminine, so that these women can swim in comfortable clothes that respect their religious faith.
Another innovation concerns ecological beach bags that are created using recycled sails. Even thongs present innovations: from Indonesia comes the Paperflop, the first thong made of recyclable and Eco-sustainable materials. Their bottom is made from recycled newspapers and other Eco-friendly materials, such as palm roots and husks of coconuts. 
As for the bikini, the Canadian Franky Shaw has developed a hydrophobic material that repels water. Something different is the Sponge Suit, which is designed in California, and is a bikini made with a material that absorbs pollutants: people will use it up to twenty-five times, and then it can be recycled.

Beachwear and social network
Nowadays, it is important for companies or people with private businesses to sell their products on social platforms.
In the past, the means of communication were magazines or TV, but now users prefer to use social network because it is faster and easier with the invention of smartphones and tablets. In fact, those who have at least one profile on one of these platforms are always increasing day by day. That is why it is essential for them to use social networks as selling platforms—to not only sell their products, but also to create a relationship with the users with active participation.
This happens in all the market sectors. Now there are not only pages or profiles of beachwear companies, in which the buyer can compare the price, quality, material, and feedback, but also private sellers can focus directly on social platforms. In this case, users can purchase with a single click or comment. In brief, social networks simplify the sale and purchase markets in all sectors.

See also
 Bikini in popular culture
 Swimsuit competition
 Underwear as outerwear
 Victoria's Secret Fashion Show

References

Bibliography
Alain Corbin, The Lure of the Sea: The Discovery of the Seaside in the Western World, 1750-1840, Berkeley, University of California Press, 
Douglas Booth, Australian Beach Cultures: The History of Sun, Sand and Surf, Psychology Press, 2001, 
Emma Salizzoni, Turismo lungo le aree costiere euro mediterranee: dalla scoperta, al consumo, al progetto del paesaggio, Firenze University Press, January - June 2012

Swimsuits